The Wandering Soap Opera is a 2017 Chilean film directed by Raúl Ruiz and Valeria Sarmiento. Ruiz directed the film in 1990 and Sarmiento supervised the editing in 2017.

Summary
In seven chapters, Chilean reality is portrayed as a surreal collection of soap operas that overlap with one another.

Cast
 Luis Alarcón
 Patricia Rivadeneira
 Francisco Reyes
 Roberto Poblete
 Liliana García
 Mauricio Pesutic

Production
The Wandering Soap Opera was originally filmed by Raúl Ruiz in 1990, but was unfinished. In 2017, Ruiz's widow, Valeria Sarmiento, completed the film. The film was shot in Super 16 mm film.

Release
The film debuted at the Locarno Festival in 2017, and later premiered in the United States at the Film Society of Lincoln Center. The Cinema Guild distributed the film in North America.

References

External links

2017 films
Chilean comedy-drama films
2010s Spanish-language films
Films directed by Raúl Ruiz
Films directed by Valeria Sarmiento
2010s Chilean films